The Brazil national football team played in the 1990 FIFA World Cup, and continued to maintained their record of being the only team to enter every World Cup Finals.

Brazil played until the Last 16 stage, where they were defeated by Argentina.

Qualifying
1990 FIFA World Cup qualification (CONMEBOL Group 3)

July 30, 1989, Caracas, Venezuela -  0 - 4 

August 30, 1989, Santiago, Chile -  1 - 1 

August 20, 1989, São Paulo, Brazil -  6 - 0 

September 3, 1989, Rio de Janeiro, Brazil -  2 - 0

Goalscorers

2 goals
 Careca
 Müller

External links
1990 FIFA World Cup on FIFA.com
Details at RSSSF
History of the World Cup-1990
Planet World Cup - Italy 1990

 
Countries at the 1990 FIFA World Cup